Erie Township is one of the twelve townships of Ottawa County, Ohio, United States.  The 2000 census found 1,328 people in the unincorporated portions of the township.

Geography
Located in the central part of the county along Lake Erie, it borders the following townships:
Put-in-Bay Township - northeast, across Lake Erie
Portage Township - southeast
Bay Township - south
Salem Township - southwest
Carroll Township - northwest

A small part of the city of Port Clinton, the county seat of Ottawa County, is located in southwestern Erie Township, and the unincorporated community of Lacarne lies in the township's southwest.

Camp Perry is located along Lake Erie in Erie Township.

Name and history
It is the only Erie Township statewide.

Government
The township is governed by a three-member board of trustees, who are elected in November of odd-numbered years to a four-year term beginning on the following January 1. Two are elected in the year after the presidential election and one is elected in the year before it. There is also an elected township fiscal officer, who serves a four-year term beginning on April 1 of the year after the election, which is held in November of the year before the presidential election. Vacancies in the fiscal officership or on the board of trustees are filled by the remaining trustees.

References

External links
County website

Townships in Ottawa County, Ohio
Townships in Ohio